The Andover Village Improvement Society (AVIS) is a private land trust in Andover, Massachusetts. Founded in 1894, AVIS is the second oldest land preservation society in the United States. Its goal is to acquire land within Andover and preserve it in its natural state.

Motor vehicles, hunting, fires, or camping in these conservation lands are prohibited. Volunteer wardens are responsible for the care and oversight of each reservation.

With the rapid suburbanization and development occurring in Andover since the 1970s, AVIS has played a vital role in preserving Andover's land.

Properties

See also
Trustees of Reservations
Harold Parker State Forest
Ward Reservation

References

External links
 Andover Village Improvement Society (AVIS)
 Trustees of Reservations, Massachusetts land preservation group

Andover, Massachusetts
Protected areas of Essex County, Massachusetts
Land trusts in Massachusetts